Pekanbaru–Dumai Toll Road is a toll road linked from Pekanbaru to Dumai in Riau, Indonesia. This toll road is part of Trans-Sumatra Toll Road network.

Project
Groundbreaking of construction of this toll road was done in 2013. State owned Hutama Karya constructed the toll road. The road was originally expected to be operational by the end of 2019.
 but was only inaugurated by Indonesian President Joko Widodo on 25 September 2020.

Exits

Dumai–Mandau Link

References

Toll roads in Indonesia
Transport in Sumatra